Ellerbe Springs Hotel is a historic rural resort hotel located near Ellerbe, Richmond County, North Carolina.  It was built around 1875 and is a two-story, three part, rambling frame dwelling in the Late Victorian style.  It consists of a five bay central block with five bay flanking wings and steep hipped roofs.  It features a one-story, wraparound porch.  Also on the property is a contributing late-19th century dance pavilion. The hotel developed around a mineral spring.  Eleanor Roosevelt was a visitor to the site in 1940, when she spoke of the president's National Youth Administration program.

It was listed on the National Register of Historic Places in 1980.

References

Hotel buildings on the National Register of Historic Places in North Carolina
Victorian architecture in North Carolina
Hotel buildings completed in 1875
Buildings and structures in Randolph County, North Carolina
National Register of Historic Places in Richmond County, North Carolina